It Could Happen to You is a 1937 American drama film directed by Phil Rosen and written by Samuel Ornitz and Nathanael West. The film stars Alan Baxter, Andrea Leeds, Owen Davis Jr., Astrid Allwyn, Walter Kingsford and Al Shean. It was released on June 28, 1937 by Republic Pictures.

Plot

Cast
Alan Baxter as Bob Ames
Andrea Leeds as Laura Compton
Owen Davis Jr. as Fred Barrett
Astrid Allwyn as Angela
Walter Kingsford as Prof. Schwab
Al Shean as Max 'Pa' Barrett
Christian Rub as Clavish
Elsa Janssen as Mrs. Clavish
Edward Colebrook as Pogano
Stanley King as Detective
Nina Campana as Italian Woman
Frank Yaconelli as Greek
John Hamilton as Judge
Paul Stanton as District Attorney
Bob Murphy as Moriarity
Cy Kendall as Detective
Robert Andersen as Swede 
Bert Sprotte as German
Sada Simmons as Swedish Woman
Hans Joby as Small German

References

External links
 

1937 films
American drama films
1937 drama films
Republic Pictures films
Films directed by Phil Rosen
American black-and-white films
1930s English-language films
1930s American films